Browning, West Virginia may refer to two unincorporated communities:
Browning, Jackson County, West Virginia
Browning, Summers County, West Virginia